Anuka may refer to:
 Anuka Abashidze (d. 1721), a Queen consort of Imereti married to Simon of Imereti.
 Anuka (1698–1746), a daughter of king Vakhtang V of Kartli in what is now Georgia, who married in 1712 Prince Vakhushti Abashidze
 Theodore Basil Anuka, an MP elected in the Ghanaian parliamentary election, 2000 for Builsa North